Derik (also Romanized as Derīk; also known as Dīrīk and Dirik Qal‘eh) is a village in Shenetal Rural District, Kuhsar District, Salmas County, West Azerbaijan Province, Iran. At the 2006 census, its population was 194, in 38 families.

References 

Populated places in Salmas County